Emma Louise Williams (born 9 July 1983 in Liverpool) is a British artistic gymnast that competed at the 2000 Summer Olympics.

Reference

External links
 
 
 

1983 births
Living people
Sportspeople from Liverpool
British female artistic gymnasts
Olympic gymnasts of Great Britain
Gymnasts at the 2000 Summer Olympics